Madonna and Child was painted by one of the most influential artists of the late 13th and early 14th century, Duccio di Buoninsegna.  This iconic image of the Madonna and Child, seen throughout the history of western art, holds significant value in terms of stylistic innovations of religious subject matter that would continue to evolve for centuries.

Description and influences 
Comparing the compact size of this work of 11X8 1/8 in. to larger, more illustrious altarpieces and large scale frescoes, the Madonna and Child is understood to be an intimate, devotional image.  Some evocations of this understanding come from the burnt edges on the bottom of the original engaged frame caused by burning candles that likely would have sat just beneath.  Looking past the abrupt simplicity of the image, one can begin to understand the changes Duccio was applying to the depiction of religious figures in painting during the early 14th century.  Duccio followed other innovative Italian artists of the time like Giotto, both of whom strove to move beyond the purely iconic Byzantine and Italo-Byzantine canon and attempted to create a more tangible connection between the viewer and the objects in the painting.  For example, the parapet that sits at the bottom of the painting works as a visual enticement for the viewer to look past and into the moment that is captured between the Virgin and Christ Child.  At the same time, the parapet also acts as a barrier between the vernacular world and the sacred.

Aesthetic influences 

Many other elements of Duccio's interest in humanism are prevalent and can be seen in the tenderly draped robe worn by the Madonna and on Christ's lap, the childish reach of his hand to the Virgin's somewhat austere gaze back as she anticipates Christ's future, the luminous colors employed to the garments, and the fine details found on the inner layer of the Virgin's veil.  It is these distinct qualities that would shape the sensibility of later Sienese painting and that give Duccio's Madonna and Child such worthy attention and credibility in the history of art.  Other details found in this image are ones that stay behind in Byzantine tradition and characterize earlier works of Duccio, while the more innovative qualities prosper over time.  The tooled details in the gold ground are minute and difficult to notice at a far glance but add an important element to the image.  Punched designs were employed for the halos and the border design, all of which were hand inscribed.

History of ownership 

As is common for duecento and trecento paintings, the ownership and location of the Madonna and Child before the mid 19th century is unknown. The first known owner of the painting is the Russian Count Gregori Stroganoff (1829–1910), who said he spotted it in a dealer's shop, not attributed to any artist.  In 1904 he lent it to an exhibition at the Palazzo Pubblico of Siena (Mostra d’arte antica senese).  He kept it in his palazzo in Rome. 

Stated in her review of the 1904 Mostra d’art senese exhibition, art historian, Mary Logan Berenson believes this work to be among Duccio's “most perfect” pieces, therefore it is no surprise the painting caused an awe-inspiring reaction from exhibition viewers and especially from those in the art and art history arena.  Following the death of Stroganoff in 1910, the Duccio joined the assembly of works collected by Adolphe Stoclet (1871–1949), hence the painting's namesake, the Stoclet Madonna.  Stoclet was understood to treat his fruitful collection of art with the most careful attention and held them in the most ideal environments to preserve their unique, and many times fragile, qualities.  The Duccio was shown at few exhibitions in 1930 and 1935 and to chosen, limited guests of Stoclet at his home.

Following the death of Stoclet and his wife in 1949, their children inherited Duccio's Madonna and Child along with the rest of the collector's assemblage.  Although the coveted work of art was of interest to scholars, they were unable to access it except through photographs that fortunately document the ages of the painting and its process of restoration.  Photographs of before it was restored, and later minor retouching, to what we see now all of which reveal the time past and the true impression of the original painting of 1300.  The painting was excitingly acquired in the autumn of 2004 by the Metropolitan Museum of Art for an estimated amount of 45 million USD.  This is a highly valuable acquisition not only for the aesthetic significance in terms of the history of art, but also because there are only 13 known paintings by Duccio in the world.

Controversy 

There is debate between scholars of what the most accurate chronology of Duccio's Madonna and Child is.  There is more than 20 years of time where scholars do not have accounted works by Duccio leaving a questionable, although fairly certain estimation of the Madonna and Child to be made around 1300.  Due to the fact that some qualities of the painting are Bysantinesque like the oval shape of the Virgin's face and her elegantly long nose, and also of the “miniature man” nature of Christ Child, the lack of consensus of when it was created proceeds.  But, there are of course many innovative elements to the painting which align it appropriately in the time that is now acknowledged to be most accurate.  Along with the humanistic qualities between the Virgin and Christ Child, and the elegant draping, the marble parapet is a notable detail to the intentions of the painting, and serves as a visual invitation that encourages the viewer to engage more emotionally to the image.  This idea would continue on in a myriad of paintings proceeding this work.

Attribution

The late James Beck, Professor of Art History at Columbia University in New York, believed that Duccio's Madonna and Child, which the Met dates to 1300, is the work of a 19th-century artist or forger based on stylistic grounds. He pointed to what he considers to be the low quality of the painting and elements of content that he claims had not yet appeared in artwork of that period. Professor Beck said: "We are asked to believe that the modest little picture represents a leap into the future of Western painting by establishing a plane in front of Mary and the Child. This feature, a characteristic of Renaissance not Medieval pictures, occurs only a hundred years after the presumptive date of the picture ...". Beck's conclusions were published in 2007 in his book, From Duccio to Raphael: Connoisseurship in Crisis in which he also disputes the attribution of the National Gallery of London's painting Madonna of the Pinks to Raphael.

Keith Christiansen, the Met's curator of European paintings, disagrees with Beck's contention. Christiansen has noted that, in addition to stylistic analysis of the painting in relation to other known works by the painter, the museum conducted a thorough examination of the painting, including the wooden panel's construction, the painting's underdrawing and pigment composition and found them consistent with an attribution to Duccio and a date of around 1300. Christiansen said: "What everyone else sees as a sign of quality and innovation, Beck sees as weakness. There is no reason to doubt the period and authenticity of the picture."

References

External links
 

Paintings by Duccio
1300s paintings
Paintings in the collection of the Metropolitan Museum of Art
Paintings of the Madonna and Child